Giuseppe Tellera (March 14, 1882 in Bologna – February 7, 1941) was a general in the Italian Army during World War II.

Italian Tenth Army 
On 23 December 1940 General Tellera took over the command of the Italian Tenth Army from Lt. Gen Italo Gariboldi. At the time the Tenth Army was trying to stop the British Operation Compass, which had begun 9 December with the Attack on Nibeiwa. At the beginning of the offensive the Tenth Army consisted of four Army Corps with nine divisions and two brigade-sized armored groups, but by 23 December the 1st Libyan Division, 2nd Libyan Division, 4th CC.NN. Division "3 Gennaio" and Maletti Group had been destroyed in the Battle of Sidi Barrani, while the 1st CC.NN. Division "23 Marzo", 2nd CC.NN. Division "28 Ottobre", 62nd Infantry Division "Marmarica", 63rd Infantry Division "Cirene", and remnants of the 64th Infantry Division "Catanzaro" were encircled at Bardia leaving Tellera only with the 61st Infantry Division "Sirte" and the Babini Group.

Tellera, who had already served as staff officer during World War I on the Italian front and been the Chief of Staff under General Balbo and Graziani, set out to build up a defense with whatever reinforcements he received. The 61st Infantry Division "Sirte" was sent to garrison Tobruk, while the rest of the units remained near Gazala. After the British had captured Bardia and Tobruk, Tellera ordered the newly arrived 60th Infantry Division "Sabratha" to set up a defensive line between Derna and Al Qubbah, while the Special Armored Brigade took up positions at Mechili.

On 24 January 1941 the British 7th Armoured Division dislodged the Special Armored Brigade during the action at Mechili, while the Australian 6th Division attacked the Sabratha on 25 January. On 29 January Tellera ordered a general retreat along the Via Balbia road towards Benghazi. However the British Combeforce had already blocked the road at Beda Fomm. The Italians attempted to break out on 6–7 February during the Battle of Beda Fomm and Tellera rode into battle in a M13/40 tank, but the repeated - though poorly coordinated - frontal attacks by the Italian armour, were futile and the last remnants of the Tenth Army were forced to surrender. After the battle British forces found Tellera in his disabled tank and he died of wounds in hospital the following day. Struck by his heroic resistance, the British army buried him with full military honours in Benghazi.

Awards and honours
For his gallantry in action Lt. Gen. Tellera was posthumously awarded the Medaglia d'oro al valor militare, the highest military decoration in the Italian Army.
The award citation read as follow:

“Chief of staff of the Armed Forces North Africa, with organized and active perception, especially in the period that led to the victory of our arms Sidi El Barrani. He took over, in a particularly critical situation, the command of an Army Corps, kept during the forced withdrawal from Cyrenaica Gebel, more serene calm, giving evidence of high-capacity light control and eminent personal worth. In the battle of South Bengasino when the enemy had made impossible the withdrawal of our troops on Agedabia, stopped in a two days fighting, the vehemence of the opponent, and inflict heavy losses, forcing it to desist from its push into Sirtica. Gather the troops remaining in extreme defense in a place of particular importance, he tried repeatedly, with great personal risk, to collect the last means to break through and break the enemy encirclement. In this supreme and heroic effort, fell gloriously on the field, properly sealing a life of dedication to the entire country”.
Sidi El Barrani (AS), September 1940-Agedabia, February 6, 1941.

References 

 Macksey, Major Kenneth (1971). Beda Fomm: Classic Victory. Ballentine's Illustrated History of the Violent Century, Battle Book Number 22. New York: Ballantine Books. .
Angelo Dal Boca, “La tragica fine della X armata e del suo comandante”. The tragic end of the tenth Army, and its comandant .
Letter from Libya /Lettera dalla Libia del generale Tellera, in “I sentieri della ricerca. Rivista di storia contemporanea” 3 (2006), 73–90.

1941 deaths
Italian military personnel of World War II
Italian generals
Italian military personnel killed in World War II
1882 births